The Farabundo Martí National Liberation Front (FMLN) is a left-wing political party in El Salvador.

The FMLN was formed as an umbrella group on 10 October 1980, from five leftist guerrilla organizations; the Fuerzas Populares de Liberación Farabundo Martí (FPL), the People's Revolutionary Army (ERP), the Resistencia Nacional (RN), the Partido Comunista Salvadoreño (PCS) and the Partido Revolucionario de los Trabajadores Centroamericanos (PRTC). The FMLN was one of the main participants in the Salvadoran Civil War. After the Chapultepec Peace Accords were signed in 1992, all armed FMLN units were demobilized and their organization became a legal left-wing political party in El Salvador.

On 15 March 2009, the FMLN won the presidential elections with former journalist Mauricio Funes as its candidate. Two months earlier in municipal and legislative elections, the FMLN won the majority of the mayoralties in the country and a plurality of the National Assembly seats. Funes is now wanted by the Salvadoran authority for corrupt actions, such as illegally money laundering more than $700,000 in his personal bank account and was found guilty of illegal enrichment by the Supreme court. Funes and his son fled to Nicaragua, where they were granted political asylum by Daniel Ortega and became citizens.

Civil war and emergence 
Tensions began to build between the farmers and the elite class in the time leading up to the Salvadoran Civil War including political assassinations by the Salvadoran government on outspoken critics starting in the early 1970s. In 1979, farmers went on strike for higher wages and better working conditions on Hacienda California, a large farm in Tierra Blanca. Due to this strike, National Guard troops responded to the growing violence in Tierra Blanca using military force. As the violence spread into the residential areas of El Salvador, animosity heightened between the campesinos and the elite class. The previously politically withdrawn campesinos began to join the FMLN and other left-wing guerrilla groups.

On 17 December 1979, in period of national crisis, the three dominant organizations (FPL, RN and PCS) of the Salvadoran left formed the Coordinadora Político-Militar. The CPM's first manifesto was released on 10 January 1980, and the day after, the Coordinadora Revolucionaria de Masas was formed as a union of revolutionary mass organizations. CRM later merged with the Frente Democrático Salvadoreño to form the Frente Democrático Revolucionario.

It is alleged by the United States that some credit for the unity of the five organizations that formed the FMLN may belong to Cuba's Fidel Castro, who facilitated negotiation between the groups in Havana in December 1979. However, neither the Cuban nor Soviet government were significantly responsible for forming FMLN, although it received some of its arms and supplies from the Soviet Union and Cuba. While all five groups called themselves revolutionaries and socialists, they had serious ideological and practical differences, and there had been serious conflicts, even including in some cases bloodshed, between some of the groups during the 1970s.

On 22 May 1980, the success of negotiations led to the union of the major guerrilla forces under one flag. The Unified Revolutionary Directorate was created by the FPL, RN, ERP and PCS. DRU consisted of three Political Commission members from each of these four organizations. The DRU manifesto declared, "There will be only one leadership, only one military plan and only one command, only one political line." Despite continued infighting DRU succeeded in coordinating the group's efforts and equipped forces.

On 10 October 1980, the four organizations formed the Frente Farabundo Martí de Liberación Nacional (FMLN), taking the name of Farabundo Martí, the peasant leader during the 1932 Salvadoran peasant massacre. In December 1980, the Salvadoran branch of the Partido Revolucionario de los Trabajadores Centroamericanos broke away from its central organization and affiliated itself to FMLN. Thus the FMLN was composed of the following organizations at the time of the peace accords in 1992 (listed in the order of size):

 Bloque Popular Revolucionario (BPR), armed wing Fuerzas Populares de Liberación (FPL), "Farabundo Martí"
 Partido Comunista Salvadoreño (PCS), armed wing Fuerzas Armadas de Liberación (FAL)
 Partido de la Revolución Salvadoreña (PRS), armed wing Ejército Revolucionario del Pueblo, ERP (El Salvador)
 Resistencia Nacional (RN), armed wing Fuerzas Armadas de la Resistencia Nacional (RN-FARN)
 Partido Revolucionario de los Trabajadores Centroamericanos (PRTC), armed wing Ejército Revolucionario de los Trabajadores Centroamericanos, (ERTC)

Youth organizations of FMLN at the time of armed struggle included:
Student unions (High Schools):
 MERS – Movimiento Estudiantil Revolucionario de Secundaria (BPR)
 BRES – Brigadas Revolucionarias de Estudiantes de Secundaria (MLP)
 LPS – Ligas Populares de Secundaria (LP-28)
 AES – Asociación de Estudiantes de Secundaria (PCS)
 ARDES – Acción Revolucionaria de Estudiantes de Secundaria (FAPU)

Student unions (Universities):
 AGEUS – Asociación General de Estudiantes de la Universidad de El Salvador
 FUERSA – Frente Universitario de Estudiantes Revolucionarios "Salvador Allende"

Armed struggle 

After the formation of the FMLN, the group organized its first major military offensive on 10 January 1981. During this offensive, the FMLN established operational control over large sections of Morazán and Chalatenango departments, which remained largely under guerrilla control throughout the rest of the civil war. Insurgents ranged from children to the elderly, both male and female, and most were trained in FMLN camps in the mountains and forests of El Salvador to learn military techniques.

Another large FMLN offensive was in November 1989. In that offensive, the FMLN caught Salvadoran government and military off guard by taking control of large sections of the country and entering the capital, San Salvador. In San Salvador, the FMLN quickly took control of many of the poor neighborhoods until denied support of violence and tried to avoid being at risk and involved in the conflict as the military bombed their positions—including residential neighborhoods to drive the FMLN out.  One of the most famous battles in San Salvador took place in the Sheraton Hotel, where guerrillas and army soldiers battled floor by floor. The FMLN's November 1989 offensive did not succeed in overthrowing the government. Many analysts pointed to the FMLN's show of strength in the 1989 offensive as the turning point in the war, where it became clear that the government would not be able to defeat the FMLN militarily. Soon after the November 1989 offensive, the U.S. government started to support negotiations to end the civil war, whereas up to that point they had pursued a policy of military defeat of the FMLN. Since the U.S. government was the major funder of the Salvadoran government and military, it exercised considerable influence over the course of events. When the U.S. began to advocate negotiations instead of a military solution, a negotiated peace accord between the FMLN and the Salvadoran government was reached in fairly short order in 1992, despite a few incidents that could have marred the accord, such as the high-profile murder of the peace-seeking FPL commandante Antonio Cardenal, aka Jesus Rojas.

The United Nations has estimated that the FMLN guerrillas were responsible for 5% of the murders of civilians during the civil war, while approximately 85% of all killings of civilians were committed by the Salvadoran armed forces and death squads.

After the peace accords: participation in elections 

After the ceasefire established by the 1992 Chapultepec Peace Accords, the FMLN became a legal political party. The FMLN has now participated in elections since 1994.

The FMLN and the right-wing Nationalist Republican Alliance (ARENA) are the two dominant political parties in El Salvador. Since 2000, the FMLN has gone back and forth with ARENA in controlling the largest number of Legislative Assembly seats.  The FMLN has controlled the mayor's offices in many of the large cities of El Salvador since 1997, including the capital, San Salvador, and the neighboring city Santa Tecla. The FMLN mayor of San Salvador, was Violeta Menjívar, the first female mayor of San Salvador, who was elected in a narrow victory in 2006. The death of the FMLN's long standing leader, Jorge Schafik, boosted Violeta Menjivar's political campaign which ultimately led her to narrow win in the election of San Salvador's mayor. Schafik's death also boosted several FMLN political candidates running for positions in El Salvador's Legislative Assembly. The FMLN mayor of Santa Tecla was Oscar Ortiz, who served in that position since 2000.

In the legislative elections, held on 16 March 2003, the FMLN won 34% of the popular vote and 31 out of 84 seats in the Legislative Assembly of El Salvador, becoming the political party with the most assembly members. The FMLN's candidate in the 21 March 2004 presidential election, Schafik Hándal, won 35.6% of the vote, but was defeated by Antonio Saca of ARENA.

In the 12 March 2006 legislative election, the FMLN won 39.7% of the popular vote and 32 out of 84 legislative assembly seats. The FMLN also retained the mayor's seats in the largest cities of El Salvador, San Salvador and Santa Tecla, and hundreds of other municipalities. This was possible because one of the largest progressive coalitions in El Salvador called The Popular Social Bloc formed a pact with FMLN to help the political party win more seats in the Legislative Assembly. However, most other coalitions and groups dedicated to social change have kept away from the political party. Two months before the elections of 2009, however, the FMLN lost the mayoralty of San Salvador.

At the 18 January 2009 legislative elections, FMLN won 42.6% of the vote and 35 seats. FMLN is the largest party in the Salvadoran legislature, though it did not have a governing majority.

On 15 March 2009, the FMLN's candidate Mauricio Funes won the presidential elections.  He was inaugurated in June 2009 as the first president coming from the FMLN party. The FMLN also organized support groups during the 2009 election in order to secure votes as well as gaining more volunteers to help in the upcoming elections.

In March 2014, Vice President of El Salvador from 2009–2014, Salvador Sánchez Cerén, was elected as the new President of El Salvador. Cerén's presidential win assured the FMLN would have a party member in the presidential office for another five years.

Post-war splits and internal changes 
At the end of the civil war in 1992, the FMLN became a legal political party. At the end of the war, the FMLN still comprised the five political parties—FPL, CP, ERP, RN, PRTC—each of which retained its own organizational structure but with a leader. During the civil war, and continuing in the post-war period, people did not directly join the FMLN per se, but joined one of the five component groups.

1994 – ERP and RN leaders split 
After the end of the war, it became clear that there were serious divisions within the FMLN, some of which had existed during the war but had been somewhat hidden from the general public. Particularly it became clear between 1992 and 1994 that the leaders of the ERP and the RN had a number of disagreements with the leaders of the other parties. Soon after the 1994 Legislative Assembly elections, the leaders of the ERP and the RN left the FMLN, and took many of their members with them. The leaders of this split (including FMLN commandante Joaquin Villalobos of the ERP) then formed the Partido Democrata (Democratic Party), which was short-lived. Many members of the ERP and RN who had left in 1994 then returned to the FMLN.

1995 – Dissolving the five organizations to become a single party 
After the 1994 elections and the 1994 split, momentum grew to unify the FMLN into a single organization without separate internal parties. In 1995, the five parties that had formed the FMLN dissolved themselves. It is at that point that the FPL, CP, ERP, RN and PRTC ceased to exist, and what remained was a unified FMLN. Then people could join the FMLN directly instead of having to join one of its component parties. While this decision liquidated the parallel organizational structures inside the FMLN, there still remained strong loyalties along historic organizational lines, some of which can still be seen today.

Renovadores split 
In the 1999 presidential election, the FMLN ran Facundo Guardado as its candidate. This was a contentious decision, and many in the FMLN did not support Guardado, as they believed that his politics were moving to the right. Out of this internal conflict, two organized tendencies emerged in the FMLN—the Renovadores ("Renovators" or "Renewal Movement") and the Corriente Revolucionario y Socialista (CRS—Revolutionary Socialist Current). The two main leaders of the CRS were the historic FMLN leaders Schafik Hándal and Salvador Sanchez Ceren. The main leader of the Renovadores was Facundo Guardado. As a charismatic former FPL commander, Guardado had a base of supporters in the FMLN. He criticized the historic leadership as being too communist and called for a renovated ideology. The CRS criticized Guardado for advocating social democratic politics and for not being clearly against neoliberalism.

After a couple years of internal turmoil, in which the Revolutionary Socialist Current won the majority of the internal elections in the organization, Guardado became more frustrated, publicly attacked the FMLN leaders he didn't agree with, and took actions contrary to decisions the party had made. He was expelled from the party and some of his supporters left the FMLN. Guardado tried to form the Renovadores as its own political party, but they received negligible support in the 2003 election and then ceased to exist as a party.

After the Renovadores vs Revolutionary Socialist Current factionalism, the FMLN's leadership decided to stop organized internal tendencies, and none have emerged since then.

2005 – FDR split 
In 2004 and 2005, the FMLN experienced another split. Five FMLN Legislative Assembly members and a number of their supporters left the FMLN to form a new political party, the Democratic Revolutionary Front (Spanish: Frente Democratico Revolucionario). Some of the principal leaders of this split were Ileana Rogel and Francisco Jovel. The people who left to form the FDR chose this name because it has a legacy in the Salvadoran movement; an organization by the same name was formed under the leadership of the FMLN during the civil war to bring together parties and individuals doing legal political work during the civil war. As opposed to previous splits from the FMLN which openly proclaimed that they were ideologically 'center' or 'center-left' or were no longer self-declared "revolutionaries", the people who split to form the FDR claimed to still be part of the leftist legacy of the FMLN. In the 2006 elections, no FDR candidates won office, except for the incumbent mayor of Nejapa, Rene Canjura. Canjura was a popular FMLN mayor of the municipality of Nejapa for three consecutive periods, and therefore under FMLN statutes, would not have been eligible to run for a fourth consecutive period. So he left the FMLN and successfully ran in 2006 as the FDR candidate. No other FDR candidates won any electoral victories in 2006.

2009 and 2014 – FMLN candidates elected president 
On Sunday, 15 March 2009, an FMLN candidate, Mauricio Funes, was elected President of El Salvador. On 10 February 2016, the El Salvador Supreme Court ruled that Funes would face a civil trial for charges of illegally laundering more than $700,000 in personal bank accounts. On 28 November 2017, El Salvador's second civil court found Funes guilty of illegal enrichment.

In 2014 election Salvador Sánchez Cerén of FMLN was narrowly elected as the new President of El Salvador.

In opposition (2019–) 

FMLN lost both 2019 presidential election and 2021 legislative election dominated by new Nuevas Ideas (New Ideas) party of president Nayib Bukele.

Electoral history

Presidential elections

Legislative Assembly elections

Presidents of El Salvador

Timeline

Notable people 
 

 Jennifer Casolo
 Fermán Cienfuegos
 Mauricio Funes
 Lilian Mercedes Letona
 Ana María
 Farabundo Martí
 Luis Reyes
 Salvador Sánchez Cerén

See also 

 History of El Salvador
 Truth Commission for El Salvador

References

Citations

Sources

External links

 
Farabundo Marti Youth (official youth of the FMLN)
More Information About The National Resistance, RN

 
Political parties in El Salvador
1980 establishments in El Salvador